The 1920 Dayton football team was an American football team that represented the University of Dayton as an independent during the 1920 college football season. In its first season under head coach Bud Talbott, the team compiled a 2–4 record.

Schedule

References

Dayton
1920
Dayton football team